Milyeringidae, the blind cave gobies, is a small family of gobies, in the order Gobiiformes. There are two genera and six species within the family, which is considered to be a subfamily of the Eleotridae by some authorities. Milyeringidae includes one genus (Milyeringa) restricted to caves in the North West Cape region of Australia and the other (Typhleotris) to underground water systems in Madagascar. They are all troglobitic species and have lost their eyes.

Genera
The two genera in the family are:

 Milyeringa Whitley, 1945
 Typhleotris Petit, 1933

References

 
Gobiiformes
Cave fish
Ray-finned fish families